The Hessenliga (until 2008 Oberliga Hessen) is the highest football league in the state of Hesse and the Hessian football league system. It is one of fourteen Oberligas in German football, the fifth tier of the German football league system. Until the introduction of the 3. Liga in 2008 it was the fourth tier of the league system, until the introduction of the Regionalligas in 1994 the third tier.

Overview 
The league was formed in 1945 and except for its first two seasons it has always played as one single division. The league was called Landesliga-Hessen until 1950 and actually formed the second tier of southern German football. With the introduction of the 2nd Oberliga Süd in 1950, the Landesliga-Hessen was renamed Amateurliga Hessen. From 1978, it was called Amateur Oberliga Hessen and finally, in 1994 it was renamed Oberliga Hessen.

Since introduction of the Regionalliga Süd in 1994, the winner of the Oberliga Hessen is automatically promoted to this league. Until 1994 the winners of the Oberligas had to play-off for the four promotion spots to the 2. Bundesliga with the other Oberliga winners. 

In 1994, with the introduction of the Regionalliga, six clubs from Hesse were qualified for the new league, based on their performance over the last three seasons, these clubs being:

 Kickers Offenbach
 SV Wehen Wiesbaden
 SG Egelsbach
 Rot-Weiss Frankfurt
 KSV Hessen Kassel
 SV Darmstadt 98

Originally, FSV Frankfurt, champions of 1994, would have also been qualified but gained promotion to the 2. Bundesliga instead.

The Oberliga Hessen still remained below the Regionalliga Süd after the reduction of the number of Regionalligas from four to two in 2000 but this reduction meant that the Oberliga champions in that year were not promoted.

With the changes in the league system in 2008, four clubs from the Hessenliga were promoted to Regionalliga Süd after the 2007–08 season, nominally the top four teams, however, there was also financial requirements to receive a Regionalliga licence. The four clubs were:
 SV Darmstadt 98
 SV Wehen II
 Viktoria Aschaffenburg
 Eintracht Frankfurt II

The Hessenliga is fed by the three Verbandsligen. The winners of those are directly promoted to the Hessenliga, the three runners-up play-off for one more promotion spot.

 Feeder leagues to the Hessenliga:
 Verbandsliga Hessen-Nord
 Verbandsliga Hessen-Mitte
 Verbandsliga Hessen-Süd

The Hessenliga also, at times, accommodated teams from Bavaria, Viktoria Aschaffenburg and FC Bayern Alzenau. In the 2011–12 season, Viktoria played in the league while Alzenau played one level above in the Regionalliga.

From 2012 onwards, the league became a feeder league to the new Regionalliga Südwest, together with the Oberliga Baden-Württemberg and the Oberliga Rheinland-Pfalz/Saar. The previous league the Hessenliga was set below at, the Regionalliga Süd, was disbanded after the 2011–12 season.

Champions 
The league champions since 1945:

 The record number of league championships is held by FSV Frankfurt, with eight titles to their name (including one won by their reserve team, FSV Frankfurt II).
 In 2014 champions TGM SV Jügesheim declined promotion and no other team that applied for a Regionalliga licence finished high enough in the league to qualify.
 In 2017 champions Hessen Dreieich declined promotion. Runners-up TSV Eintracht Stadtallendorf were promoted instead.
 In 2021 there was no champion or promotion because of the decision to curtail the season during the COVID-19 pandemic in Germany.

League placings

The complete list of clubs and placings in the league since being renamed to Hessenliga in 2008:

Key

References

Sources
 Deutschlands Fußball in Zahlen,  An annual publication with tables and results from the Bundesliga to Verbandsliga/Landesliga. DSFS.
 Kicker Almanach,  The yearbook on German football from Bundesliga to Oberliga, since 1937. Kicker Sports Magazine.
 Süddeutschlands Fußballgeschichte in Tabellenform 1897–1988  History of Southern German football in tables, by Ludolf Hyll
 Die Deutsche Liga-Chronik 1945–2005  History of German football from 1945 to 2005 in tables. DSFS. 2006.

External links 
 Das deutsche Fussball Archiv  Historic German league tables
 Weltfussball.de  Round-by-round results and tables of the Oberliga Hessen from 1994 onwards
 The Hesse football leagues on Fussball.de  
 Hessian Football Association (HFV)  

 
Hessen
Football competitions in Hesse
1945 establishments in Germany